Ken and Neal Skupski were the defending champions but only Ken Skupski chose to defend his title, partnering Jonny O'Mara. Ken Skupski lost in the semifinals to Denys Molchanov and Igor Zelenay.

Molchanov and Zelenay won the title after defeating Ramkumar Ramanathan and Andrei Vasilevski 6–2, 3–6, [11–9] in the final.

Seeds

Draw

References
 Main Draw

Slovak Open - Doubles
2018 Doubles